The Council for the Historic Environment was a non government body established in 1977 in Victoria, Australia, to investigate, record and advice on heritage and building conservation. It was formed by a group of heritage professionals. academics and government bureaucrats. this was perhaps the first such group in Australia, which aimed to codify and raise the standard of professional practice amongst archaeologists, architects, engineers, historians, planners, etc.

John Murphy was the first President of the Council in 1977, with the inaugural meeting taking place in Phyllis and John's Hawthorn home. David Beauchamp is thought to have been the first Chairman with Neil Clerehan Chairman 1977-80 and President subsequently. Graeme Butler was the founding Secretary and later Editor of the Council Journal, Historic Environment, which launched in 1980. Other office bearers included Miles Lewis (President),  Helen Weston (Chair, Secretary, editor of Chen Chen, the Council newsletter), Ray Tonkin, Craig Wilson and Chris Smith  (Secretary), Robert Knott and Wendy Jacobs (Treasurer).

Formed as a break-away group from the National Trust of Victoria, the Council was made up of expert panels with each member with recognised expertise assigned to an appropriate panel, as follows:
Architectural History, 20th Century Architecture;
Architectural, Restoration, Preservation Technology;
Conservation Planning, Urban History and Geography;
Interior Design; and
Landscape Planning.

The Panel member list from 1979 included a number of individuals noted for heritage work in 1970s-90s :

 Ralph Andrews
 Bernard Barrett
 David Beauchamp
 Anne Bermingham
 Alison Blake
 Graeme Butler
 Neil Clerehan
 Carol Frank-Mas
 John Hitch
 Dewar Goode
 Wendy Jacobs
 Ian Johnson
 David Johnston
 John Kenny
 Robert Knott
 Miles Lewis
 Nigel Lewis
 Gordon Loader
 Bill Logan
 Peter Lovell
 John Mitchell
 Margaret Monk
 John Murphy
 Phyllis Murphy
 Peter Navaretti
 Ray Tonkin
 Liz Vines
 Stuart Warmington
 Judith Wells
 Helen Weston
 Craig Wilson
 Lawrie Wilson

Although always focussing on process, the Council was active in early heritage battles such as the Royal Exhibition Building in Melbourne, which was proposed for demolition at the time, as well as the fight to preserve Carlton, Victoria. It also published a journal, Historic Environment, which was the first peer reviewed heritage focussed publication in Australia, and remains the primary outlet for discussion and debate on heritage matters in Australia. With the growth of Australia ICOMOS, state heritage bodies such as the Historic Buildings Council, later becoming Heritage Victoria, the Council for the Historic Environment merged with Australia ICOMOS. The Council successfully promoted the formation of an architectural drawing collection at the State Library of Victoria with a pilot survey of selected architectural practices in 1985-6. An architectural guidebook to the Melbourne region was also commenced but never reached finality.

Following is a list of annual general meetings 1978-1984, speakers and the meeting venues as an indication of the variety and thrust of the organisation:
 1978 Hon Robert Maclellan, MLC Minister for Labour and Industry at the Former Rechabite Hall, Clarence Street, Prahran
 1979 John Mitchell, Melbourne City Councillor at Boojums Restaurant Rathdowne Street, North Carlton
 1980 Andrew Lemmon, Local historian, King Solomon's Restaurant, Nicholson Street, North Fitzroy
 1981 Peter Staughton, Restoration architect, Comedy Cafe Brunswick. Street, Fitzroy
 1982 Graham Ihlein MP (filling in for Hon Evan Walker, Minister for Planning) at Young and Jacksons, Melbourne
 1983 Professor Graeme Davidson Historian, Monash University at the newly renovated Heidelberg Town Hall Ivanhoe
 1984 Dimity Reed Deputy Manager, Ministry for Housing, Nettleton House Restaurant at the Alma Complex Abbotsford

The Council also conducted a number of tours across Victoria focussing on the various panels expertise such as industrial archaeology, architecture, heritage interiors and landscape.

References

Organizations established in 1976
Heritage organizations
Conservation and restoration organizations
1976 establishments in Australia
Historic preservation in Australia
History organisations based in Australia